Clowesia dodsoniana is an orchid of the genus Clowesia, found in the Mexican state of Michoacán. It lives at an altitude of 100 metres. It thrives in hot weather. It is pollinated by the bee Euglossa viridissima.

References 

Catasetinae